North Tongu District is one of the eighteen districts in Volta Region, Ghana. Originally it was formerly part of the then-larger and original North Tongu District on 10 March 1989, with Adidome as its capital town, which was created from the former Tongu District Council, until the western part of the district was split off to create a new North Tongu District on 28 June 2012, with Battor Dugame as its capital town, which was established by Legislative Instrument (L.I.) 2081; thus the remaining part has been renamed as Central Tongu District, with Adidome as its capital town, which was established by Legislative Instrument (L.I.) 2077. The district assembly is located in the southwest part of Volta Region and has Battor Dugame as its capital town.

Boundaries
North Tongu District is bounded by:

 the Lake Volta to the west,
 Ho Municipal District and the Akatsi South District to the east,
 South Tongu District to the south east, and
 Adaklu District to the north.

Topography
The vegetation lies in the Tropical Savannah Grassland zone. The Volta River cuts the district into two halves from north to south.

Villages
In addition to Battor Dugame, the capital and administrative centre, North Tongu District contains the following villages:

See also
 North Tongu Constituency

Sources
 
 GhanaDistricts.com

External links
 North Tongu District Official Website

References

Districts of Volta Region